Rick Braun (born July 6, 1955) is a smooth jazz trumpet, flugelhorn, trombone and keyboards player, vocalist, composer, and record producer.

Career
Braun was born in Allentown, Pennsylvania and attended Dieruff High School. His mother was a self-taught pianist and banjoist. Braun played drums at Dieruff High School, and followed his brother in playing trumpet. In the 1970s, he attended the Eastman School of Music, and while a student there became a member of a jazz-fusion band, Auracle, along with, amongst others, keyboards player John Serry, saxophone and flute player Steve Kujala and vibes player Steve Rehbein (later Steve Raybine). The band worked with producer Teo Macero and Braun co-produced the second album City Slickers (minus John Serry and Steve Kujala).

During the 1980s, he entered the pop music world, releasing an album in Japan as a singer.  He then worked as a songwriter for Lorimar (Warner Chappell), writing the song "Here with Me" with REO Speedwagon which became a top twenty hit. When he returned to the trumpet, he worked as a studio musician and touring member with Crowded House, Natalie Cole, Glenn Frey, Jack Mack and the Heart Attack, Tom Petty, Sade, Rod Stewart, Tina Turner, and War.

In 1992 he released his debut solo album, Intimate Secrets (Mesa), followed in 1994 by two solo albums, Night Walk and Christmas Present.  The former featured him playing just muted trumpet and flugelhorn.  His popularity increased enough by 1995, when he released Beat Street, that he was persuaded to pursue a solo career.

He has cited as influences Miles Davis, Lee Morgan, Chet Baker, Clark Terry, Dizzy Gillespie and Herb Alpert, with the last one inspiring his album All It Takes including a song called "Tijuana Dance", a play on Alpert's band Tijuana Brass. One of his influences was Freddie Hubbard, and Braun composed a song, "Freddie Was Here" in 2008, which he recorded on his album, All it Takes, in tribute to Hubbard, who died that year.

He achieved several top chartings including Kisses in the Rain (as high as number 1), R n R (as high as number 1),  All It Takes (as high as number 2),  and Can You Feel It (as high as number 1) along with charting at the Traditional Jazz Albums for the first time in 2011 with the vocal album Sings with Strings (as high as number 9).

Braun performs in the band BWB, with saxophonist Kirk Whalum and guitarist Norman Brown. He has performed live with known musicians such as Candy Dulfer, Dave Koz, Jackiem Joyner, and Peter White.

In 2005, he and saxophonist Richard Elliot co-founded ARTizen Music Group (now known as Artistry Music) and once had Rykodisc as a distributor.

Braun won Gavin Report's Artist of the Year twice.

Discography

Albums

BWB (Rick Braun, Kirk Whalum, Norman Brown)

Compilation appearances
New Age Music & New Sounds Vol. 67 – Liberty

Songs co-written
"Here With Me" (with Kevin Cronin)

References

External links 

1955 births
Living people
21st-century American male musicians
21st-century trumpeters
American jazz singers
American jazz trumpeters
American male jazz musicians
American male trumpeters
BWB (band) members
Eastman School of Music alumni
Jazz musicians from Pennsylvania
Louis E. Dieruff High School alumni
Mack Avenue Records artists
Musicians from Allentown, Pennsylvania
Smooth jazz trumpeters